The NATO Communications and Information Agency (NCI Agency) is NATO's technology and cyber hub.

The Agency provides C4ISR (Command, Control, Communications, and Computers, Intelligence, Surveillance, and Reconnaissance; refer to Command and control terminology) technology, including cyber and missile defence.

Organization 
The NCI Agency, led by the General Manager, is headquartered in Brussels, Belgium. The Agency is the executive arm of the NATO Communication and Information Organisation (NCIO).

NCIO is managed by an Agency Supervisory Board (ASB) composed of representative from each NATO member state. The ASB oversees the work of the NCIO. After consulting with the NATO Secretary General, NCIO’s ASB appoints the General Manager of the Agency. All 30 NATO states are members of the NCIO.

The ASB, which reports to the North Atlantic Council (NAC), issues directives and makes general policy decisions to enable NCIO to carry out its work. Its decisions on fundamental issues such as policy, finance, organization and establishment require unanimous agreement by all member countries.

Evolution 
At the Lisbon Summit in November 2010, NATO Heads of State and Government agreed to reform the 14 existing NATO Agencies, located in seven member states. In particular, Allies agreed to streamline the agencies into three major programmatic themes: procurement, support, and communications and information. The reform aims to enhance efficiency and effectiveness in the delivery of capabilities and services, to achieve greater synergy between similar functions and to increase transparency and accountability.

As part of the reform process, the NCI Agency was created on 1 July 2012 through the merger of the NATO C3 Organisation, NATO Communication and Information Systems Services Agency (NCSA), NATO Consultation, Command and Control Agency (NC3A), NATO Air Command and Control System Management Agency (NACMA), and NATO Headquarters Information and Communication Technology Service (ICTM).

Management 
The NCI Agency is led by the General Manager, Mr. Ludwig Decamps. Mr. Decamps was elected by the NATO member states to serve as General Manager of the agency, effective 1 July 2021.

Location 
The NATO Communications and Information Agency's (NCI Agency) has 4 main campuses located in the European Union – Brussels and Mons in Belgium, The Hague in The Netherlands, and Oeiras in Portugal. The NCI Agency has over 30 locations in Europe, North America and South-East Asia.

Services 
The NCI Agency's area of expertise and key projects range from missile defense to secure desktops:

 Command and Control services
 Common Operational Picture tools for the land, maritime and air domains
 Medical information and coordination system
 Education and Training
 Support to Exercises and Operations
 Operational analysis, defence planning
 Air and Missile Defence Command and Control
 Air Command and Control System to conduct air policing and protect NATO European airspace
 Ballistic Missile Defence
 NATO’s consultation and command networks
 Core enterprise services for NATO entities and Nations 
 Federated Mission Networking for Forces
 Modernization of NATO’s IT
 Joint Intelligence, Surveillance and Reconnaissance
 Airborne IP chat capability for the AWACS aircraft
 Secure satellite communications for Alliance Ground Surveillance
 iGeoSIT
 Cyber security services
 NATO’s cyber shield
 NATO Computer Incident Response Capability
 NATO Industry Cyber Partnership
 NATO Rapid Reaction Team

Success at Locked Shields 
NATO, led by the NATO Communications and Information (NCI) Agency, won the world’s largest live-fire cyber exercise, Locked Shields 2018 for the third consecutive year.

References 

Information operations units and formations of NATO